Laurent Daumail (born 1980), better known by his stage name DJ Cam, is a French record producer. Daumail's music is largely rooted in hip hop, combined with elements of jazz, dub, and ambient and composed using samples. Daumail first rose to prominence in the 1990s with records such as Underground Vibes and Underground Live, which have been credited as early examples of trip hop, and he emerged as a leading figure in the decade's "ambient hip-hop" scene. He founded the record label Inflamable. In addition to his own musical output, Daumail has produced several compilations and albums for other artists.

Fact named his 1996 release Abstract Manifesto the ninth best trip hop album of all time.

Discography

Studio albums
Underground Vibes (1995)
Substances (1996)
Abstract Manifesto (1996)
The Beat Assassinated (1998)
Loa Project (Volume II) (2000)
Soulshine (2002)
Liquid Hip Hop (2004)
Seven (2011)
Miami Vice (2015)
Beats  (2016)
Thug Love (2017)
90s (2019)

With DJ Cam Quartet
Rebirth of Cool (2008)
Diggin''' (2009)Stay (2009)The Soulshine Session (2016)

Live albumsUnderground Live (1996)Live in Paris (2017)

Mix albumsMad Blunted Jazz (1996)DJ-Kicks: DJ Cam'' (1997)

References

External links
 

1973 births
Living people
Musicians from Paris
French DJs
French hip hop musicians
French electronic musicians
Chill-out musicians
Trip hop musicians
Electronic dance music DJs
French hip hop record producers
Columbia Records artists